Riverdale High School is a public high school on Roberts Drive in Riverdale, Georgia, United States. The school serves about 1,400 students in grades 9 to 12 in the Clayton County Public Schools district. Its current principal is Jamille Miller-Brown.

The school first opened in 1977 with a few unfinished projects to complete the construction of the school. Students and staff began use of the facilities on November 7 of that year.

The school's mascot is a pirate, giving the name "Riverdale Raiders" to students and faculty. A flag with an "R" supported by a pirate's sword is the school's logo.

R&B singer Ciara, who graduated from Riverdale High School in 2003, revisited to receive a key to the city of Riverdale on October 19, 2006.

The school had additional renovations. In summer 2017, Riverdale High School had a new $13.3 million gymnasium. Riverdale High School's new facility is the biggest competitive gymnasium in the county with a capacity of 2,300 persons. It replaces the old gymnasium that was built in 1977.

In Summer 2019, Riverdale High School had more renovations to bring a modern facade to the front and other changes to the school. Renovations were completed later in 2020 and cost $17 million.

References

External links
 
 Clayton County Public Schools

Schools in Clayton County, Georgia
Educational institutions established in 1978
Public high schools in Georgia (U.S. state)